Mawk'allaqta, also Mawk'a Llaqta, (Quechua mawk'a ancient, llaqta place (village, town, city, country, nation), "ancient place", Hispanicized spelling Maukallacta) is an archaeological site in Peru. It is located in the Puno Region, Sandia Province, Sandia District. The site was declared a National Cultural Heritage (Patrimonio Cultural) of Peru by the National Institute of Culture.

References 

Archaeological sites in Peru
Archaeological sites in Puno Region